Grand International Airways (or Grand Air) was an airline in the Philippines during the mid to late 1990s.

History

The airline was established when the Philippine Government started to deregulate its domestic aviation industry after decades of monopoly by Philippine Airlines, then wholly owned by the government.

Grand Air was owned by the Panlilio family, which also owned Grand Boulevard Hotel in Roxas Boulevard, Philippine Village Hotel (Airport Hotel) and Puerto Azul - a resort hotel in Cavite.

Towards the mid 1990s, Grand Air used to fly to Hong Kong Kai Tak using their Airbus A300s.

The airline was forced to fold operation due to mounting debt problem with its Taiwanese creditors.

Destinations 
Grand Air flew (or have planned to fly) to the following destinations:

Hong Kong – Kai Tak Airport

Bandar Seri Begawan – Brunei International Airport

Beijing – Beijing Capital International Airport

Jakarta – Soekarno-Hatta International Airport

Tokyo – Narita International Airport

Kuala Lumpur – Subang International Airport

Cagayan de Oro – Lumbia Airport
Cebu – Mactan–Cebu International Airport
Davao – Francisco Bangoy International Airport
General Santos – General Santos International Airport
Iloilo – Mandurriao Airport
Manila – Ninoy Aquino International Airport (Hub)
Puerto Princesa – Puerto Princesa International Airport
Tacloban – Daniel Z. Romualdez Airport

Changi Airport

Seoul – Gimpo International Airport

Taipei – Chiang Kai-shek International Airport

Bangkok – Don Mueang International Airport

Hanoi – Noi Bai International Airport
Ho Chi Minh City – Tan Son Nhat International Airport

Fleet

The airline operated a fleet of 5 Airbus A300B4-200 and 4 Boeing 737-200 aircraft.

Code data
IATA Code: 8L
ICAO Code: GDI

References

Companies based in Manila
Defunct airlines of the Philippines
Airlines established in 1995
Airlines disestablished in 1999
Philippine companies established in 1995
1999 disestablishments in the Philippines